Dryinus is a cosmopolitan genus of dryinid parasitic wasp. Over 242 species have been described worldwide. Numerous fossil species have been described from the Baltic, Dominican and Burmese ambers.

References 

Dryinidae
Hymenoptera genera
Extant Cenomanian first appearances